Valhalla  is a hamlet and census-designated place (CDP) within the town of Mount Pleasant, in Westchester County, New York, United States, in the New York City metropolitan area. Its population was 3,162 at the 2010 U.S. Census. The name was inspired by a fan of the composer Richard Wagner, and the hamlet is known both as the home of the primary hospital campus of Westchester Medical Center and New York Medical College and as the burial place of numerous noted people. Valhalla is the realm of the gods in Norse mythology.

History

Kensico Cemetery 

The Kensico Cemetery was founded in 1889 in Valhalla at a time when many of the cemeteries in the city of New York were filling up, and several rural cemeteries were founded near the railroads that served the metropolis.

The Kensico Cemetery is the final resting place of the writer Paddy Chayefsky (The Americanization of Emily and Network), actress Billie Burke, who played Glinda, the "Good Witch of the North", in the classic film The Wizard of Oz, alongside her famed Broadway impresario husband, Florenz Ziegfeld Jr. Also interred within Kensico Cemetery and Gate of Heaven Cemetery are the big band leader Tommy Dorsey; the New Yorker cartoonist Peter Arno; the former CBS News president Fred Friendly; the legendary New York Yankees star Lou Gehrig; the film star and comedian Danny Kaye; the comedian and TV pioneer Soupy Sales; the virtuoso pianist, composer, and conductor, Sergei Rachmaninoff; the author Ayn Rand; NBC founder David Sarnoff; artist Robert De Niro, Sr.; and the first Chief Scout Executive of the Boy Scouts of America, James E. West. It is also where Herbert Howard Booth, the son of the Salvation Army founder William Booth, who was the founder of the Salvation Army Musical Department is interred. Also buried there is actress Anne Bancroft, and Giovanni Turini, a sculptor from Italy, who made the bust of Giuseppe Mazzini in Central Park and the statue of Giuseppe Garibaldi in Washington Square, a man he served in the fighting surrounding the unification of Italy. It is also the resting place of Harriet Quimby, America's first certified female pilot. The Pakistani writer and delegate to the United Nations, Patras Bokhari. is also buried there.

Valhalla and neighboring Hawthorne are fairly densely packed with cemeteries, albeit not as densely as Colma, California.

Recent events 
On July 12, 2006, the Westchester tornado, an F2 event, touched down in nearby Hawthorne and proceeded to move into Valhalla, causing much destruction in the Stonegate section of the community. This was one of the strongest tornadoes the area had ever seen, as tornadoes of this magnitude are mostly in the Midwest. Power lines were knocked down, and hundreds of trees were uprooted. There were no deaths, but much of Valhalla changed as a result.

On September 11, 2006, The Rising memorial to September 11 victims was dedicated at the Kensico Dam by Westchester County and the Westchester County September 11 Memorial Committee. The Rising honors the 109 county residents who were killed in the terrorist attacks.

In July 2007, Valhalla hosted the opening ceremony of the 2007 Empire State Games. The ceremony was held at the Kensico Dam honoring the athletes and their families and was attended by Governor Eliot Spitzer among other politicians. ESPN's Jeremy Schaap was a keynote speaker.

On February 3, 2015, in the Valhalla train crash, a Metro-North train crashed into a Mercedes-Benz SUV that was stuck on the tracks at Commerce Street near the Taconic State Parkway. The crash caused six deaths and 15 injuries, including seven serious.

Geography

Demographics

As of the census of 2000, there were 5,379 people, 1,847 households, and 1,470 families residing in the hamlet. The population density was 2,010.6 per square mile (774.9/km2). There were 1,886 housing units at an average density of 704.9/sq mi (271.7/km2). The racial makeup of the hamlet was 95.85% White, 0.76% African American, 0.07% Native American, 2.12% Asian, 0.02% Pacific Islander, 0.30% from other races, and 0.87% from two or more races. Hispanic or Latino of any race were 3.36% of the population.

Valhalla has a large Italian-American population. As of the 2000 U.S. Census, 34.2% of residents were of Italian ancestry, the 28th highest number of Italian-Americans per capita of all communities in the United States.

There were 1,847 households, out of which 33.5% had children under the age of 18 living with them, 69.2% were married couples living together, 7.8% had a female householder with no husband present, and 20.4% were non-families. 16.9% of all households were made up of individuals, and 7.7% had someone living alone who was 65 years of age or older. The average household size was 2.83 and the average family size was 3.20.

In the hamlet the population was spread out, with 23.3% under the age of 18, 5.9% from 18 to 24, 28.1% from 25 to 44, 24.9% from 45 to 64, and 17.8% who were 65 years of age or older. The median age was 41 years. For every 100 females, there were 94.5 males. For every 100 females age 18 and over, there were 89.6 males.

The median income for a household in the hamlet was $76,003, and the median income for a family was $91,205. Males had a median income of $60,814 versus $38,608 for females. The per capita income for the hamlet was $33,939. About 0.6% of families and 1.7% of the population were below the poverty line, including 1.7% of those under age 18 and 1.4% of those age 65 or over.

As noted above, Valhalla's population was 3,162 at the 2010 U.S. Census, an apparent decline of 2,217 that may reflect the impact of the 2006 tornado, but more likely due to redrawing of CDP borders, which can change from one census to the next.

Economy and institutions
Valhalla is the location of Westchester Medical Center, New York Medical College, Westchester Community College of the State University of New York, and the Westchester County jail.

In April 2017, Westchester County officials unveiled plans for an 80-acre, 3 million square-foot biotechnology hub to be built with US$1.2 billion in private investment on vacant land adjacent to Westchester Medical Center in Valhalla; the bioscience center, a public-private partnership, is anticipated to create 12,000 new jobs and include over 2.25 million square feet of biotechnology research space.

Highlights 
Valhalla is the location of the Mount Pleasant Town Hall as well as the Mount Pleasant Town Pool and Community Center.  The main street in Valhalla is Columbus Avenue, which runs the length of the hamlet.  Along this road is the Valhalla train station. The Valhalla train station is located right off the Taconic State Parkway, across from the hamlet's commercial center. The train station is the next major stop of Metro-North Railroad after North White Plains, when proceeding northbound from New York City.

Columbus Avenue also contains the Kensico Dam, and Holy Name of Jesus Church, as well as shops and restaurants.  The Valhalla ZIP Code (10595) includes portions of the towns of Mount Pleasant, Greenburgh, and North Castle. The hamlet is bordered by the North White Plains area of North Castle, the northernmost portion of the town of Greenburgh, and the hamlets of Thornwood and Hawthorne, both within Mount Pleasant.  The Valhalla School District, comprising parts of the three towns, is served by the Virginia Road Elementary School, located in the southernmost part of the hamlet in Greenburgh, and the Kensico School and Valhalla Middle and High Schools, all located along Columbus Avenue in Mount Pleasant. Some residents with Valhalla addresses are in the Mount Pleasant Central School District, served by Westlake High School in Thornwood. The John A. Hartford House was added to the National Register of Historic Places in 1977 as a National Historic Landmark. It serves as administrative offices of SUNY Westchester Community College.

Education

The Roman Catholic Archdiocese of New York operates Catholic schools in Westchester County. Holy Name of Jesus School closed in 2013.

Notable people
 Kevin Meaney (1956–2016), actor and comedian 
 Dalmazio Santini (1923–2001), composer
 Sal Yvars (1924–2008), Major League Baseball player

References

External links 
 

Census-designated places in New York (state)
Census-designated places in Westchester County, New York
Hamlets in New York (state)
Hamlets in Westchester County, New York